Dawar is a village in  Gurez Tehsil in Bandipora district of Jammu and Kashmir.

Demographics
According to the 2011 census of India, Dawar has 506 households. The literacy rate of Dawar village was 86.80% compared to 67.16% of Jammu and Kashmir. In Dawar, Male literacy stands at 92.63% while the female literacy rate was 71.18%.

Transport

Road
Dawar is connected by road with other places in Jammu and Kashmir and India by the Kanzalawn-Dawar Road and Bandipora-Gurez Road.

Rail
The nearest railway stations to Dawar are Sopore railway station and Baramulla railway station located at a distance of 114 and 124 kilometres respectively.

Air

See also
Jammu and Kashmir
Gurez
Bandipore

References

Villages in Bandipora district